In physics and mathematics, a pseudovector (or axial vector) is a quantity that is defined as a function of some vectors or other geometric shapes, that resembles a vector, and behaves like a vector in many situations, but is changed into its opposite if the orientation of the space is changed, or an improper rigid transformation such as a reflection is applied to the whole figure. Geometrically, the direction of a reflected pseudovector is opposite to its mirror image, but with equal magnitude.  In contrast, the reflection of a true (or polar) vector is exactly the same as its mirror image.

In three dimensions, the curl of a polar vector field at a point and the cross product of two polar vectors are pseudovectors.

One example of a pseudovector is the normal to an oriented plane. An oriented plane can be defined by two non-parallel vectors, a and b, that span the plane. The vector  is a normal to the plane (there are two normals, one on each side – the right-hand rule will determine which), and is a pseudovector. This has consequences in computer graphics where it has to be considered when transforming surface normals.

A number of quantities in physics behave as pseudovectors rather than polar vectors, including magnetic field and angular velocity. In mathematics, in three-dimensions, pseudovectors are equivalent to  bivectors, from which the transformation rules of pseudovectors can be derived. More generally in n-dimensional geometric algebra pseudovectors are the elements of the algebra with dimension , written ⋀n−1Rn. The label "pseudo" can be further generalized to pseudoscalars and pseudotensors, both of which gain an extra sign flip under improper rotations compared to a true scalar or tensor.

Physical examples
Physical examples of pseudovectors include torque, angular velocity, angular momentum, magnetic field, and magnetic dipole moment.

Consider the pseudovector angular momentum . Driving in a car, and looking forward, each of the wheels has an angular momentum vector pointing to the left. If the world is reflected in a mirror which switches the left and right side of the car, the "reflection" of this angular momentum "vector" (viewed as an ordinary vector) points to the right, but the actual angular momentum vector of the wheel (which is still turning forward in the reflection) still points to the left, corresponding to the extra sign flip in the reflection of a pseudovector.

The distinction between polar vectors and pseudovectors becomes important in understanding the effect of symmetry on the solution to physical systems. Consider an electric current loop in the  plane that inside the loop generates a magnetic field oriented in the z direction. This system is symmetric (invariant) under mirror reflections through this plane, with the magnetic field unchanged by the reflection. But reflecting the magnetic field as a vector through that plane would be expected to reverse it; this expectation is corrected by realizing that the magnetic field is a pseudovector, with the extra sign flip leaving it unchanged.

In physics, pseudovectors are generally the result of taking the cross product of two polar vectors or the curl of a polar vector field. The cross product and curl are defined, by convention, according to the right hand rule, but could have been just as easily defined in terms of a left-hand rule. The entire body of physics that deals with (right-handed) pseudovectors and the right hand rule could be replaced by using (left-handed) pseudovectors and the left hand rule without issue. The (left) pseudovectors so defined would be opposite in direction to those defined by the right-hand rule.

While vector relationships in physics can be expressed in a coordinate-free manner, a coordinate system is required in order to express vectors and pseudovectors as numerical quantities. Vectors are represented as ordered triplets of numbers: e.g. , and pseudovectors are represented in this form too. When transforming between left and right-handed coordinate systems, representations of pseudovectors do not transform as vectors, and treating them as vector representations will cause an incorrect sign change, so that care must be taken to keep track of which ordered triplets represent vectors, and which represent pseudovectors. This problem does not exist if the cross product of two vectors is replaced by the exterior product of the two vectors, which yields a bivector which is a 2nd rank tensor and is represented by a 3×3 matrix. This representation of the 2-tensor transforms correctly between any two coordinate systems, independently of their handedness.

Details

The definition of a "vector" in physics (including both polar vectors and pseudovectors) is more specific than the mathematical definition of "vector" (namely, any element of an abstract vector space). Under the physics definition, a "vector" is required to have components that "transform" in a certain way under a proper rotation: In particular, if everything in the universe were rotated, the vector would rotate in exactly the same way. (The coordinate system is fixed in this discussion; in other words this is the perspective of active transformations.) This important requirement is what distinguishes a vector (which might be composed of, for example, the x-, y-, and z-components of velocity) from any other triplet of physical quantities (For example, the length, width, and height of a rectangular box cannot be considered the three components of a vector, since rotating the box does not appropriately transform these three components.)

(In the language of differential geometry, this requirement is equivalent to defining a vector to be a tensor of contravariant rank one. In this more general framework, higher rank tensors can also have arbitrarily many and mixed covariant and contravariant ranks at the same time, denoted by raised and lowered indices within the Einstein summation convention.

A basic and rather concrete example is that of row and column vectors under the usual matrix multiplication operator: in one order they yield the dot product, which is just a scalar and as such a rank zero tensor, while in the other they yield the dyadic product, which is a matrix representing a rank two mixed tensor, with one contravariant and one covariant index. As such, the noncommutativity of standard matrix algebra can be used to keep track of the distinction between covariant and contravariant vectors. This is in fact how the bookkeeping was done before the more formal and generalised tensor notation came to be. It still manifests itself in how the basis vectors of general tensor spaces are exhibited for practical manipulation.)

The discussion so far only relates to proper rotations, i.e. rotations about an axis. However, one can also consider improper rotations, i.e. a mirror-reflection possibly followed by a proper rotation. (One example of an improper rotation is inversion through a point in 3-dimensional space.)

The transformation rules for polar vectors and pseudovectors can be compactly stated as

 

where the symbols are as described above, and the rotation matrix R can be either proper or improper. The symbol det denotes determinant; this formula works because the determinant of proper and improper rotation matrices are +1 and −1, respectively.

Behavior under addition, subtraction, scalar multiplication

Suppose v1 and v2 are known pseudovectors, and v3 is defined to be their sum, . If the universe is transformed by a rotation matrix R, then v3 is transformed to

 

So v3 is also a pseudovector. Similarly one can show that the difference between two pseudovectors is a pseudovector, that the sum or difference of two polar vectors is a polar vector, that multiplying a polar vector by any real number yields another polar vector, and that multiplying a pseudovector by any real number yields another pseudovector.

On the other hand, suppose v1 is known to be a polar vector, v2 is known to be a pseudovector, and v3 is defined to be their sum, . If the universe is transformed by an improper rotation matrix R, then v3 is transformed to

 

Therefore, v3 is neither a polar vector nor a pseudovector (although it is still a vector, by the physics definition). For an improper rotation, v3 does not in general even keep the same magnitude:

 .

If the magnitude of v3 were to describe a measurable physical quantity, that would mean that the laws of physics would not appear the same if the universe was viewed in a mirror. In fact, this is exactly what happens in the weak interaction: Certain radioactive decays treat "left" and "right" differently, a phenomenon which can be traced to the summation of a polar vector with a pseudovector in the underlying theory. (See parity violation.)

Behavior under cross products

For a rotation matrix R, either proper or improper, the following mathematical equation is always true:
,
where v1 and v2 are any three-dimensional vectors. (This equation can be proven either through a geometric argument or through an algebraic calculation.)

Suppose v1 and v2 are known polar vectors, and v3 is defined to be their cross product, . If the universe is transformed by a rotation matrix R, then v3 is transformed to

So v3 is a pseudovector. Similarly, one can show:
polar vector × polar vector = pseudovector
pseudovector × pseudovector = pseudovector
polar vector × pseudovector = polar vector
pseudovector × polar vector = polar vector
This is isomorphic to addition modulo 2, where "polar" corresponds to 1 and "pseudo" to 0.

Examples

From the definition, it is clear that a displacement vector is a polar vector. The velocity vector is a displacement vector (a polar vector) divided by time (a scalar), so is also a polar vector. Likewise, the momentum vector is the velocity vector (a polar vector) times mass (a scalar), so is a polar vector. Angular momentum is the cross product of a displacement (a polar vector) and momentum (a polar vector), and is therefore a pseudovector. Continuing this way, it is straightforward to classify any of the common vectors in physics as either a pseudovector or polar vector. (There are the parity-violating vectors in the theory of weak-interactions, which are neither polar vectors nor pseudovectors. However, these occur very rarely in physics.)

The right-hand rule

Above, pseudovectors have been discussed using active transformations. An alternate approach, more along the lines of passive transformations, is to keep the universe fixed, but switch "right-hand rule" with "left-hand rule" everywhere in math and physics, including in the definition of the cross product and the curl. Any polar vector (e.g., a translation vector) would be unchanged, but pseudovectors (e.g., the magnetic field vector at a point) would switch signs. Nevertheless, there would be no physical consequences, apart from in the parity-violating phenomena such as certain radioactive decays.

Formalization
One way to formalize pseudovectors is as follows: if V is an n-dimensional vector space, then a pseudovector of V is an element of the (n − 1)-th exterior power of V: ⋀n−1(V). The pseudovectors of V form a vector space with the same dimension as V.

This definition is not equivalent to that requiring a sign flip under improper rotations, but it is general to all vector spaces.  In particular,  when n is even, such a pseudovector does not experience a sign flip, and when the characteristic of the underlying field of V is 2, a sign flip has no effect. Otherwise, the definitions are equivalent, though it should be borne in mind that without additional structure (specifically, either a volume form or an orientation), there is no natural identification of ⋀n−1(V) with V.

Another way to view this homomorphism for  odd is that in this case .

Geometric algebra
In geometric algebra the basic elements are vectors, and these are used to build a hierarchy of elements using the definitions of products in this algebra. In particular, the algebra builds pseudovectors from vectors.

The basic multiplication in the geometric algebra is the geometric product, denoted by simply juxtaposing two vectors as in ab. This product is expressed as:

where the leading term is the customary vector dot product and the second term is called the wedge product. Using the postulates of the algebra, all combinations of dot and wedge products can be evaluated. A terminology to describe the various combinations is provided. For example, a multivector is a summation of k-fold wedge products of various k-values. A k-fold wedge product also is referred to as a k-blade.

In the present context the pseudovector is one of these combinations. This term is attached to a different multivector depending upon the dimensions of the space (that is, the number of linearly independent vectors in the space). In three dimensions, the most general 2-blade or bivector can be expressed as the wedge product of two vectors and is a pseudovector. In four dimensions, however, the pseudovectors are trivectors. In general, it is a -blade, where n is the dimension of the space and algebra. An n-dimensional space has n basis vectors and also n basis pseudovectors. Each basis pseudovector is formed from the outer (wedge) product of all but one of the n basis vectors. For instance, in four dimensions where the basis vectors are taken to be {e1, e2, e3, e4}, the pseudovectors can be written as: {e234, e134, e124, e123}.

Transformations in three dimensions
The transformation properties of the pseudovector in three dimensions has been compared to that of the vector cross product by Baylis. He says: "The terms axial vector and pseudovector are often treated as synonymous, but it is quite useful to be able to distinguish a bivector from its dual." Given a set of right-handed orthonormal basis vectors , the cross product is expressed in terms of its components as:

where superscripts label vector components. In this context of geometric algebra, this bivector is called a pseudovector, and is the Hodge dual of the cross product. That is, the dual of e1 is the subspace perpendicular to e1, namely the subspace spanned by e2 and e3. With this understanding,

For details, see . The cross product and wedge product are related by:

where  is called the unit pseudoscalar. It has the property:

Using the above relations, it is seen that if the vectors a and b are inverted by changing the signs of their components while leaving the basis vectors fixed, both the pseudovector and the cross product are invariant. On the other hand, if the components are fixed and the basis vectors eℓ  are inverted, then the pseudovector is invariant, but the cross product changes sign. This behavior of cross products is consistent with their definition as vector-like elements that change sign under transformation from a right-handed to a left-handed coordinate system, unlike polar vectors.

Note on usage
As an aside, it may be noted that not all authors in the field of geometric algebra use the term pseudovector, and some authors follow the terminology that does not distinguish between the pseudovector and the cross product. However, because the cross product does not generalize to other than three dimensions,
the notion of pseudovector based upon the cross product also cannot be extended to a space of any other number of dimensions. The pseudovector as a -blade in an n-dimensional space is not restricted in this way.

Another important note is that pseudovectors, despite their name, are "vectors" in the sense of being elements of a vector space. The idea that "a pseudovector is different from a vector" is only true with a different and more specific definition of the term "vector" as discussed above.

See also 
Exterior algebra
Clifford algebra
Antivector, a generalization of pseudovector in Clifford algebra
Orientability — Discussion about non-orientable spaces.
Tensor density

Notes

References

 
 
 
 Axial vector at Encyclopaedia of Mathematics
  
  
 : The dual of the wedge product  is the cross product .

Linear algebra
Vector calculus
Vectors (mathematics and physics)